KF Rahoveci is a professional football club from Kosovo which competes in the First League. The club is based in Rahovec. Their home ground is the City Stadium Stadium which has a seating capacity of 2,000.

See also
 List of football clubs in Kosovo

References

Football clubs in Kosovo
Association football clubs established in 1931
Orahovac